Aubrey Ankrum (born April 26, 1972) is an American screenwriter, animator and graphic artist.  He is mostly known as one of the creators of the popular Flash cartoon Happy Tree Friends.  He also worked on several Mondo Media shows and has made graphics for many companies.

Career
As an animator, Aubrey worked on many internet shows specially for the company Mondo Media. He was the creator, director and head writer of the popular internet cartoon The God & Devil Show. There he worked with Kenn Navarro and Rhode Montijo on a short cartoon called Banjo Frenzy.  The short then became the series Happy Tree Friends which became an internet phenomenon.  In the show Aubrey voiced the characters of Pop and Flippy (mainly his evil side, but he also voiced his good side until 2005). The HTF Third Strike DVD shows that he also did the robot voice and what sounds like baby talk.  According to writer Warren Graff, Aubrey has left Happy Tree Friends but they sample his voice rather than replacing him for the voices of Evil Flippy and Pop. He also did the voice of the Croc Hunter, Abe Lincoln and of Kathie Lee Gifford for The God & Devil Show.

As a graphic artist and animator he has worked for Microsoft, Macromedia, Disney, Warner Bros., BBC America and Cartoon Network.  Aubrey lives in the Bay Area with his two daughters.

Filmography
As writer
Space Ghost Coast to Coast (2 episodes, 1999) (TV)
Happy Tree Friends: Volume 1: First Blood (2002) (V)
Celebrity Deathmatch (7 episodes, 2000–2002) (TV)
Happy Tree Friends, Volume 2: Second Serving (2003) (V)
Happy Tree Friends, Volume 3: Third Strike (2004) (V)
Happy Tree Friends: Winter Break (2004) (V)
Happy Tree Friends: Mole in the City (2005) (V)
Happy Tree Friends: Overkill (2005) (V)
Happy Tree Friends: False Alarm (2008) (VG)
Ka-Pow! (3 episodes, 2008) (TV)
Happy Tree Friends (27 episodes, 2006–2013) (TV)
As voice artist
Celebrity Deathmatch (2 episodes, 1998–2001) (TV)
"The Iron Giant" (1999) (additional voices)
Happy Tree Friends: Volume 1: First Blood (2002) (V)
Happy Tree Friends, Volume 2: Second Serving (2003) (V)
Happy Tree Friends, Volume 3: Third Strike (2004) (V)
Happy Tree Friends: Winter Break (2004) (V)
Happy Tree Friends: Overkill (2005) (V)
Ka-Pow! (1 episode, 2008) (TV)
Happy Tree Friends (17 episodes, 2006–2009) (TV)
As actor
Ever Since the World Ended (2001)
As producer
Happy Tree Friends, Volume 3: Third Strike (2004) (V)
Happy Tree Friends: Overkill (2005) (V)
Happy Tree Friends: Ski Patrol (2006)
Happy Tree Friends (13 episodes, 2006) (TV)
As Graphic artist & hand-drawn animator
The Lion King (1994)
Anastasia (1997)
Mulan (1998)
The Iron Giant (1999)

References

External links
 
 

1972 births
Living people
Animators from California
American children's writers
American animated film directors
American television directors
Flash artists
Artists from San Francisco